The 1975–76 New Mexico Lobos women's basketball team represented the University of New Mexico in the 1975-76 AIAW women's basketball season. In their second season, the Lobos were coached by Kathy Marpe. They played in the Intermountain Conference.

Roster

Schedule and Results

Notes

References

New Mexico Lobos women's basketball seasons